Yassin Ibrahim (born 9 February 2000) is a German footballer who plays as a winger for Regionalliga West club SV Rödinghausen.

Career
Ibrahim made his professional debut for Würzburger Kickers in the 3. Liga on 20 July 2019, coming on as a substitute in the 79th minute for Dominik Widemann in the 3–1 home win against Bayern Munich II.

Personal life
Ibrahim was born in Münster, North Rhine-Westphalia and is of Sudanese descent.

References

External links
 
 Profile at DFB.de
 Profile at kicker.de

2000 births
Living people
Sportspeople from Münster
Footballers from North Rhine-Westphalia
German footballers
Germany youth international footballers
German people of Sudanese descent
Association football midfielders
Würzburger Kickers players
SV Rödinghausen players
3. Liga players
Regionalliga players